As visual perception varies logarithmically, it is helpful to have an appreciation of both illuminance and luminance by orders of magnitude.

Illuminance
To help compare different orders of magnitude, the following list describes various source of lux, which is measured in lumens per square metre.

Luminance
This section lists examples of luminances, measured in candelas per square metre and grouped by order of magnitude.

See also
 Photometry (optics)
 Extraterrestrial sky

Notes and references

Illuminance
Photometry